TruMark Financial Credit Union, headquartered in Fort Washington, Montgomery County, Pennsylvania, is the fifth largest credit union in Pennsylvania. The credit union currently has 24 branch locations within Southeastern Pennsylvania, including Bucks, Chester, Delaware, Montgomery, and Philadelphia Counties. TruMark Financial serves members in Southeastern Pennsylvania. 

TruMark Financial was founded in 1939 by a handful of Bell Telephone Company of Pennsylvania employees, and provides savings, transaction, and credit services.

References

External links
Official website

Credit unions based in Pennsylvania
Banks established in 1939
1939 establishments in Pennsylvania